Wiesbaden-Biebrich station is a railway station in the borough of Biebrich in the Hessian state capital of Wiesbaden  on the East Rhine Railway from Wiesbaden to Cologne. It is classified by Deutsche Bahn as a category 6 station. The station was opened in 1856.

Services
Biebrich lies in the area served by the Rhein-Main-Verkehrsverbund (Rhine-Main Transport Association, RMV). It is used by Regionalbahn trains operated by VIAS, and buses.

Trains
Regionalbahn services operate at hourly intervals on the Frankfurt Hauptbahnhof–Neuwied route. In the rush hour, the service extends to a half-hourly interval.

Buses 
The station is also served by the bus lines 47 and 147.

Notes

Railway stations in Wiesbaden
Railway stations in Germany opened in 1856